Mark Tony Bantock is a former English international bowls player.

Bantock was an England captain and won a silver medal in the Men's pairs at the 2006 Commonwealth Games and a bronze medal at the lawn bowls competition at the 2010 Commonwealth Games. In 2009 he won the fours silver medal at the Atlantic Bowls Championships.

He announced his retirement in 2012.

References

English male bowls players
Bowls players at the 2010 Commonwealth Games
Commonwealth Games medallists in lawn bowls
Living people
1969 births
Commonwealth Games silver medallists for England
Commonwealth Games bronze medallists for England
Medallists at the 2006 Commonwealth Games
Medallists at the 2010 Commonwealth Games